Harry Hamilton Lees (11 May 1900–1966) was an English footballer who played in the Football League for Darlington and Wolverhampton Wanderers.

References

1900 births
1966 deaths
English footballers
Association football forwards
English Football League players
Ebbw Vale F.C. players
Wolverhampton Wanderers F.C. players
Darlington F.C. players
Shrewsbury Town F.C. players
Stourbridge F.C. players
Leamington F.C. players